The Ashland Place Historic District is a single-family residential district in Phoenix, Arizona. It was one of the first speculative residential developments in Phoenix. The Period Revival and bungalow style residences were built in the 1920s by Home Builders, Inc. in association with realtors Greene and Griffin.

Some houses were designed by Phoenix architect C. Lewis Kelley, the "Home Artist" for the builders, who is known for his Period Revivals styled houses.

Ashland Place was added to the National Register of Historic Places on December 21, 1994.

References

Historic districts on the National Register of Historic Places in Arizona
Tudor Revival architecture in the United States
Mission Revival architecture in Arizona
Buildings and structures completed in 1920
Maricopa County, Arizona
National Register of Historic Places in Phoenix, Arizona